Bodenseekreis ("Lake Constance district") is a Landkreis (district) in the south-east of Baden-Württemberg, Germany. Neighboring districts are (from west, clockwise) Konstanz, Sigmaringen and Ravensburg, and in Bavaria,  Lindau district. To the south, on the opposite shores of Lake Constance, lies Switzerland.

History 
The district was created in 1973, when the previous district Tettnang was merged with most of the district Überlingen.

Geography 
The district is located at the northern shore of Lake Constance, which also gives the district its name. The landscape covered by the district is called Oberschwäbisches Hügelland and Westallgäuer Hügelland, and as the name suggests it is mostly hilly landscape.

Partnerships
The district has a partnership with the Muldentalkreis in Saxony, Germany, as well as with the Polish district Częstochowa.

Coat of arms 
The blue colour as well as the three wavy lines at the bottom of the coat of arms represent the Lake Constance. The wheel derives from the coat of arms of the Lords of Markdorf and Raderach, but it also represents the industry in the district.

Cities and towns

References

External links

 (German)

 
Tübingen (region)
Districts of Baden-Württemberg